Billy Yates is the self-titled debut album of American country music singer Billy Yates. It was released on June 17, 1997, via Almo Sounds.

Content
The album's lead single was "I Smell Smoke", but due to several radio stations playing the track "Flowers" instead, Almo Sounds withdrew "I Smell Smoke" and released "Flowers" instead. "Flowers" would peak at number 36 on the Billboard Hot Country Songs charts in mid-1997. "When the Walls Come Tumblin' Down" was the album's third and final single release.

George Jones covered "Choices" on his 1999 album Cold Hard Truth.

Critical reception
Joel Bernstein of Country Standard Time was favorable toward Yates' voice and the production of Garth Fundis. He thought that some of the songs such as "Long Neck Connected to the Beer Joint" were "silly", but praised the lyrics of "Broken Hearted Me", "Mama Said", and "Easier Said Than Done" in particular. Bob Cannon of Entertainment Weekly rated the album "C+", calling "Flowers" "maudlin" and overall finding Yates' style imitative of Merle Haggard.

Track listing

Charts

References

1997 debut albums
Billy Yates (singer) albums
Almo Sounds albums
Albums produced by Garth Fundis